National parks in Thailand are defined as an area that contains natural resources of ecological importance or unique beauty, or flora and fauna of special importance.  Thailand's protected areas included 156 national parks, 58 wildlife sanctuaries, 67 non-hunting areas, and 120 forest parks. They cover almost 31 percent of the kingdom's territory.

The parks are administered by the National Parks, Wildlife and Plant Conservation Department (DNP), of the Ministry of Natural Resources and Environment (MNRE). The department was created in 2002, and took over the national parks from the Royal Forest Department of the Ministry of Agriculture.

The first national park was Khao Yai in 1961, when the National Park Act B.E. 2504 was passed. The first marine park was Khao Sam Roi Yot, established in 1966. In 1993 the administration of the national parks was split into two divisions, one for the terrestrial and one for the Marine National Park Division (MNPD).

Controversies about Thailand's national parks include complaints over excessive development and allotment of private concessions. Ko Samet, and other island-based national parks, are particularly impacted by the activities of private concessions, often in the form of excessive bungalow developments.  Many of the northern parks are greatly impacted by illegal swidden farming and poaching.

Thai highlands (Part 1: 19 national parks)

Not yet published in the Government Gazette (9 national parks)

Thai highlands (Part 2: 31 national parks)

Not yet published in the Government Gazette (6 national parks)

Northeast (21 national parks)

Not yet published in the Government Gazette (2 national parks)

Central-East (27 national parks)

Not yet published in the Government Gazette (1 national park)

South (east coast: 15 national parks)

 Marine parks

Not yet published in the Government Gazette (4 national parks)

South (west coast: 20 national parks)

 Marine parks

Not yet published in the Government Gazette (1 national park)

Changed names of national parks

Notes
 Area: the area of the national park according to the last publication in the Government Gazette
 Area: the area of the national park (preparation) according to the DNP list
 Order N.P.: according to first to last publication in the Government Gazette.
 DNP: more information and a map of the specific national park.
 Gazette date: the date of the last publication in the Government Gazette.
 Gazette source: the webpage with the pdf document of the publication in the Government Gazette.
 PARO: management of Thailand's national parks since 2002 in 16 regions with 5 branches.
 Visitors: visitor numbers to Thailand's national parks are for the 2019 fiscal year, which runs from October 1, 2018 to September 30, 2019.

See also
List of forest parks of Thailand
List of protected areas of Thailand
List of Ramsar wetlands of Thailand
List of Protected Areas Regional Offices of Thailand

References

External links

National Park, Wildlife and Plant Conservation Department
The former National Park Division of the Forest Department
The former Marine National Park Division of the Forest Department
List of Thailand National parks
Birdwatching sites in Thailand

Thailand

Parks in Thailand
National Parks
Environment of Thailand
National parks